No. 61 (Rust and Blue) is a 1953 painting by the Russian-American Abstract expressionist artist Mark Rothko. The work was first exhibited at the Museum of Modern Art, New York in 1961 but is now in the collection of the Museum of Contemporary Art, Los Angeles. Similar to Rothko's other works from this period, No. 61 consists of large expanses of color delineated by uneven, hazy shades. The Rust and Blue painting was a part of the Color Field Movement as No. 61 relies on subtle tonal values that are often variations of a monochromatic hue. Rust and Blue also uses layered coloring to enrich the hues in the painting, a quality the artist Mark Rothko described as "inner light". Rothko painted in such a way that at times paint can be seen flowing upward across the surface. This illusion can be seen in No. 61 since Rothko inverted the painting toward the final stages of his work.

Notes

Sources
Baal-Teshuva, Jacob. Rothko. Berlin: Taschen, 2003. 

1953 paintings
Paintings by Mark Rothko
Paintings in Los Angeles